In physics, Wigner's 9-j symbols were introduced by Eugene Paul Wigner in 1937. They are related to recoupling coefficients in quantum mechanics involving four angular momenta

Recoupling of four angular momentum vectors

Coupling of three angular momenta can be done in several ways, as explained in the article on Racah W-coefficients.

Both sets of functions provide a complete, orthonormal basis for the space with dimension  spanned by

Hence, the transformation between the two sets is unitary and the matrix elements of the transformation are given by the scalar products of the functions. 
As in the case of the Racah W-coefficients the matrix elements are independent of the total angular momentum projection quantum number:

Symmetry relations
A 9-j symbol is invariant under reflection about either diagonal as well as even permutations of its rows or columns:

An odd permutation of rows or columns yields a phase factor , where

For example:

Reduction to 6j symbols
The 9-j symbols can be calculated as sums over triple-products of 6-j symbols where the summation extends over all  admitted by the triangle conditions in the factors:
.

Special case
When  the 9-j symbol is proportional to a 6-j symbol:

Orthogonality relation
The 9-j symbols satisfy this orthogonality relation:

The triangular delta  is equal to 1 when the triad (j1, j2, j3) satisfies the triangle conditions, and zero otherwise.

3n-j symbols
The sums are over all combinations of  that the -j coefficients admit, i.e., which lead to non-vanishing contributions.

If each 3-jm factor is represented by a vertex and each j by an edge, these -j symbols can be mapped on certain 3-regular graphs with  vertices and  nodes. The 6-j symbol is associated with the K4 graph on 4 vertices, the 9-j symbol with the utility graph on 6 vertices (K3,3), and the two distinct (non-isomorphic) 12-j symbols with the Q3 and Wagner graphs on 8 vertices.
Symmetry relations are generally representative of the automorphism group of these graphs.

See also

 Clebsch–Gordan coefficients
 3-j symbol, also called 3-jm symbol 
 Racah W-coefficient
 6-j symbol

References

External links
  (Gives answer in exact fractions)
  (Answer as floating point numbers)
 
  (accurate; C, fortran, python)
  (fast lookup, accurate; C, fortran)

Rotational symmetry
Representation theory of Lie groups
Quantum mechanics